Panayiotis Simopoulos is one of Greece's top male fashion models.  He has appeared in numerous fashion magazines and events promoting Greek and international products and appearing on ad campaigns for department stores such as JC Penney. He booked the campaign for the Dolce & Gabbana catalogue Summer 2006, shooting by Marianco Vivanco.  He is represented by Ace Model Agency, based in Athens, Greece.

Job Appearances
Dolce & Gabbana, S/S 06 campaign
Autumn Cashmere
Armani
Cole Haan
Beau Brummel
Velvet Underground
Levi's *Givenchy
Paul Smith
Giorgio Armani
Rene Lezard, F/W 06 campaign
"Daniel Hechter , F/W 06 campaign"
"Levi’s Silver Tab , F/W 05 campaign "
"Edwin, F/W 04 campaign"

Agencies
KULT, Hamburg
DNA, New York
Models One, London
New Madison, Paris
WHY NOT, Milan

External links
Models

Greek male models
Living people
Year of birth missing (living people)